The Lumsden Heritage Trust was formed in November 2013 to preserve the past, promote the future and provide an attraction for visitors. The trust has two ex-AFFCO locomotives that were formerly preserved by the Goldfields Railway, the chassis of P 60, ex-New Zealand Railways (NZR) wagons that were formerly preserved by the Ohai Railway Board Heritage Trust, a railway station including a crane next to it and a jail from the Lumsden camping grounds.

The trust planned to recover two V class steam locomotives from the Mararoa Junction Locomotive Dump in the Ōreti River These two locomotives were unearthed in 2018. On 29 January 2020, V 127 was recovered and put on display, but it proved impracticable to remove V 126. After further consideration a new attempt to remove V 126 was made on 27 February 2020, and this proved successful. The following day the locomotive was also put on display.

The trust plans to relocate the original wooden Anglican All Saints Church to re-purpose it as a regional war memorial museum and to host some of the events being planned to commemorate World War I.

Locomotives and rolling stock

NZR steam locomotives

Industrial diesel locomotives

Wagons

References

2013 establishments in New Zealand
Museums established in 2013
Rail transport preservation in New Zealand
Southland, New Zealand